Józefków may refer to the following places:
Józefków, Gmina Gostynin in Masovian Voivodeship (east-central Poland)
Józefków, Gmina Szczawin Kościelny in Masovian Voivodeship (east-central Poland)
Józefków, Świętokrzyskie Voivodeship (south-central Poland)
Józefków, Opole Voivodeship (south-west Poland)